Amaryllis is the fourth studio album by American rock band Shinedown. It was announced on January 3, 2012, the same day as the first single, "Bully," was released, for release on March 27, with pre-orders opening on January 17. A music video for the song "Unity" was released on March 12. An e-book about the making of Amaryllis, titled For Your Sake: Inside the Making of Amaryllis, was released concurrently with the album.

The album was recorded at Lightning Sound Studios, Ocean Way Recording, No Excuses Studios and Capitol Studios, and was produced by Rob Cavallo, who also produced the band's previous album, The Sound of Madness. Amaryllis was released on Atlantic Records in the United States and via Roadrunner elsewhere.

Speaking about the album, Shinedown singer Brent Smith said that "During the recording [of Amaryllis], the vision of what Shinedown is and where it's going became completely clear. Amaryllis is the manifestation of that vision, the centerpiece of what Shinedown is. It reflects on everything we've done and where we're heading. It's a message of empowerment, perseverance, and inspiration that I think speaks to fans that have been with us since the beginning as well as those who are just learning about who we are and what we're about." "Adrenaline" served as the official theme song to WWE's Extreme Rules (2012). The album's second single, "Unity", was released on May 15. The album's third single, "Enemies" was used as the theme song to WWE Raw from July 25, 2016, to January 22, 2018.

On October 22, 2014, the album was certified Gold by the RIAA for sales of over 500,000 copies.

Track listing

There is also an unreleased song from the Amaryllis sessions called The Underground.

The band announced the previously unreleased song "Atlas Falls" would be available as part of a $50 shirt bundle with all proceeds benefiting the humanitarian charity Direct Relief.

Personnel
Shinedown
 Brent Smith – lead vocals
 Zach Myers – guitar, backing vocals
 Barry Kerch – drums, backing vocals on "Adrenaline"
 Eric Bass – bass, backing vocals, additional production

Additional musicians
 David Campbell – conducting, string and horn arrangements
 Dave Bassett – additional guitar, backing vocals on "Bully" and "Enemies", additional production
 Rob Cavallo – additional guitar and keyboards
 Tim Pierce – additional guitar
 Jamie Muhoberac – keyboards and piano
 West Los Angeles Children's Choir (August Bagg, Hannah "Caz" Blatt, Boyce Buchanan, Arielle Cohen, Lowell Novitch, Skylar Saltzman, Finn Snyder, Sonam KC, Andrew Steele and Mario Thomas) – choir on "Bully"
 Barbara Klaskin Silberg – choir director
 Wayne Bergeron – piccolo trumpet solo on "I'm Not Alright"
 Rick Baptist and John Furno – trumpets on "I'm Not Alright"
 Steve Becknell and Paul Klintworth – horns on "I'm Not Alright"
 Alan Kaplan and Steve Holtman – trombones  on "I'm Not Alright"
 Charlie Bisharat (concertmaster), Jackie Brand, Darius Campo, Kevin Connolly, Mario Delcon, Tammy Hatwan, Gerry Hillera, Songa Lee, Natalie Leggett, Serena McKinney, Sid Page, Alyssa Park, Katia Popov, Michelle Richards, Josefina Vergara, John Wittenberg and Ken Yerke – violins on "Amaryllis", "Unity", "I'm Not Alright", "I'll Follow You" and "Through the Ghost"
 Roland Kato, Denyse Buffum, Andrew Duckles, Matt Funes and Kate Vincent – violas on "Amaryllis", "Unity", "I'm Not Alright", "I'll Follow You" and "Through the Ghost"
 Steve Richards, Paula Hochhalter, Kim Scholes, Rudy Stein and Suzie Katayama (contractor) – celli on "Amaryllis", "Unity", "I'm Not Alright", "I'll Follow You" and "Through the Ghost"
 Dave Stone, Mike Valerio, Nico Abondolo and Don Ferrone – double bass on "Amaryllis", "Unity", "I'm Not Alright", "I'll Follow You" and "Through the Ghost"

Technical personnel
 Rob Cavallo – producer
 Doug McKean – engineering
 Steve Rea, Ross Waugh, Wes Seidman, Jake Gorski, Charlie Paakkari and Bryan Morton – assistant engineering at Lightning Sound Studios, Ocean Way Recording, Capitol Studios and No Excuses Studio
 The Gyrlz (Dana Calitri, Nina Ossoff and Kathy Sommer) and Martin Briley – additional vocal and instrumental production
 Lars Fox – additional ProTools engineering
 Scott Gibson McKay – additional ProTools editing
 Chris Lord-Alge – mixing at Mix LA, Tarzana, Los Angeles, CA
 Keith Armstrong and Nik Karpen – assistant mix engineering
 Andrew Schubert and Brad Townsend – additional mix engineering
 Ted Jensen – mastering at Sterling Sound, New York, NY
 Mike Fasano and Brandon "Bear" Alanis – drum technicians
 Todd Youth and RJ Ronquillo – guitar and bass technicians
 Cheryl Jenets – production management
 Clayton Jackson and Michelle Rogel – production assistants
 Steve Robertson – A&R
 Anne DeClemente and Craig Rosen – A&R administration
 Anthony Delia – marketing
 David J. Harrigan III – art direction and design
 James Minchin III – photography
 Pamela Simon – packaging management
 Bill McGathy and Gwyther Bultman (In De Goot Entertainment) – management
 Ron Opaleski (William Morris Endeavor) – booking
 Jess Rosen – legal representation
 David Weise, Beth Sabbagh and Laurie Davis (David Weise & Associates) – business management

Chart positions
Amaryllis debuted at No. 4 on the Billboard 200 with 106,000 units sold in its first week; giving Shinedown their highest first week sales and highest entry on the charts. As of October 22, 2014, Amaryllis has sold 500,000 copies in the U.S.

Weekly charts

Year-end charts

Certifications

References

2012 albums
Albums produced by Rob Cavallo
Atlantic Records albums
Shinedown albums
Albums recorded at Capitol Studios